Boxing, for the 2013 Bolivarian Games, took place from 24 November to 29 November 2013.

Medal table
Key:

Medal summary

Men's events

Women's events

References

Events at the 2013 Bolivarian Games
2013 in boxing
2013 Bolivarian Games